Endoceras (Ancient Greek for "inner horn") is an extinct genus of large, straight shelled cephalopods that gives its name to the Nautiloid order Endocerida. The genus lived during the middle and upper Ordovician 485 to 419 million years ago. The cross section in the mature portion is slightly wider than high, but is narrower laterally in the young. Sutures are straight and transverse. Endoceras has a large siphuncle, located close to the ventral margin, composed of concave segments, especially in the young but which may be tubular in the adult stage. Endocones are simple, subcircular in cross section, and penetrated by a narrow tube which may contain diaphragms reminiscent of the Ellesmerocerid ancestor.
 
Endoceras was named by Hall in 1847. Distribution is widespread, especially in North America and Europe; and fossils have been found in Australia. 
Endoceras is similar to Cameroceras, the two may be synonymous, but differs from the genus Nanno in that the siphuncle in Nanno fills the entire apical portion of the shell while in Endoceras the siphuncle is ventral even there with septa formed at the onset.

Mature, full grown, Endoceras were most likely ambush predators that lay in wait on the sea floor, moving when necessary to gain the advantage. Younger individuals with compressed cross sections may have been more actively mobile.

Size

A specimen of Endoceras giganteum at the Museum of Comparative Zoology measures  as preserved. This would make it the largest cephalopod by length in the fossil record. There is additionally an unconfirmed report of a  shell that was destroyed.

References
Teichert, C. 1964. Endoceratoidea; Treatise on Invertebrate Paleontology, Part K; Geol Soc of America and University of Kansas Press

Prehistoric cephalopod genera
Middle Ordovician first appearances
Late Ordovician extinctions
Paleozoic cephalopods of North America
Paleozoic life of Ontario
Verulam Formation
Paleozoic life of Manitoba
Paleozoic life of Newfoundland and Labrador
Paleozoic life of the Northwest Territories
Paleozoic life of Nunavut
Paleozoic life of Quebec